McElligot's Pool is a children's book written and illustrated by Theodor Geisel under the pen name Dr. Seuss and published by Random House in 1947. In the story, a boy named Marco, who first appeared in Geisel's 1937 book And to Think That I Saw It on Mulberry Street, imagines a wide variety of fantastic fish that could be swimming in the pond in which he is fishing. It later became one of the Seuss books featured in the Broadway musical Seussical where its story is used for the song "It's Possible".

Plot
The story begins with a boy named Marco fishing in a small, trash-filled pond known as McElligot's Pool. A local farmer laughs at the boy and tells him that he will never be able to catch anything. Nevertheless, Marco holds out hope and begins to imagine a scenario in which he might be able to catch a fish.

First, he suggests that the pool might be fed by an underground brook that travels under a highway and a hotel to reach the sea. Marco then imagines a succession of fish and other creatures that he might catch in the sea and therefore the pool. He imagines, among others, a fish with a checkerboard stomach, a seahorse with the head of an actual horse, and an eel with two heads. When Marco is done imagining, he tells the farmer, "Oh, the sea is so full of a number of fish, if a fellow is patient, he might get his wish!"

Creation
Geisel painted some of the water colors that illustrate McElligot's Pool while vacationing with his wife, Helen, at the summer home of their friend Kelvin Vanderlip, in Southern California. The book was the first Dr. Seuss book to use water colors for its illustrations, but because of budget concerns, Random House published half of the book in black and white, alternating between two pages in color and two pages in black and white. Marco, the book's main character, first appeared in And to Think That I Saw It on Mulberry Street, the first Dr. Seuss book published in 1937 by Vanguard Press.

Geisel dedicated the book to his father, whom the dedication refers to as "the World's Greatest Authority on Blackfish, Fiddler Crabs, and Deegel Trout". According to Dr. Seuss biographers Judith and Neil Morgan, "deegel trout" was a private joke between Geisel and his father that was started during a fishing trip when Geisel was a boy. His father had bought large trout from Deegel hatchery and pretended that they had caught them.

Reception
McElligot's Pool, Geisel's first book in seven years, was published by Random House in 1947 and was well received. It became a Junior Literary Guild selection and garnered Geisel his first Caldecott Honor.

The review in the Saturday Review of Literature stated: "Children will have nothing but admiration for this boy who heard there were no fish in McElligot's Pool and then saw them swimming in from the sea". M.B. King of the Chicago Sun emphasized the book's humor: "This time prepare to chuckle under water for you'll be meeting the weirdest, wildest, funniest creatures of the sea which imagination can conjur". S.J. Johnson of Library Journal called the book "as divinely idiotic" as Dr. Seuss' earlier title And to Think That I Saw It on Mulberry Street.

American trade editions of the book were printed in 1947, 1974, 1975, and 1992, and a library edition was printed in 1999.

Withdrawal from publication
On March 2, 2021, Dr. Seuss Enterprises withdrew McElligot's Pool and five other books from publication because they "portray people in ways that are hurtful and wrong". Dr. Seuss Enterprises did not specify which illustrations were offensive. The book uses the word "Eskimo" in one instance, as an adjective describing a type of imagined fish that might swim from the North Pole to McElligot's Pool.  The term "Eskimo" could be considered old-fashioned in American English, and has been deemed by some as offensive in Canadian English. There is an accompanying illustration depicting the fantastical group of "Eskimo Fish" in hooded fur parkas. 

After the books were removed, nine of the top ten, including the top four, books on Amazon's charts in the United States were Dr. Seuss books, though none were the books removed.  eBay also delisted the title for "offensive content".

References

Sources

See also
One Fish Two Fish Red Fish Blue Fish

1947 children's books
American picture books
Books by Dr. Seuss
Caldecott Honor-winning works
Random House books
Sequel books
Works about fishing
Race-related controversies in literature
Stereotypes of Inuit people